Tomasz Jaszczuk (born 9 March 1992 in Siedlce) is a Polish athlete specialising in the long jump. He finished fourth at the 2017 European Indoor Championships. He also won the silver medal at the 2011 European Junior Championships.

His personal bests in the event are 8.15 metres outdoors (+1.2 m/s, Szczecin 2014) and 7.98 metres indoors (Belgrade 2017).

International competitions

References

1992 births
Living people
Polish male long jumpers
People from Siedlce
Polish Athletics Championships winners